Tiago dos Santos e Silva (born April 12, 1987) is a Brazilian mixed martial artist who competed in the Featherweight division of the Ultimate Fighting Championship.

Mixed martial arts career

Early career

Starting his career in 2009, Trator compiled a 18–4–1 (1) record fighting mostly for regional Brazilian promotions, winning the Vacant Jungle Fight Lightweight Championship in the process.

Ultimate Fighting Championship

Tiago made his promotional debut against Akbarh Arreola dos Santos on July 26, 2014 at UFC on Fox 12. He won the fight via unanimous decision.

Trator faced Mike De La Torre on February 22, 2015 at UFC Fight Night 61.  Trator lost the fight via TKO in the first round.

Trator faced Clay Collard on September 5, 2015 at UFC 191 as an injury replacement for Andre Fili. Trator won the fight by split decision.

Trator faced promotional newcomer Shane Burgos  on December 9, 2016 at UFC Fight Night 102 against Tiago Trator. He lost the fight by unanimous decision.

He was released from the UFC sometime in 2017.

Post UFC

After his release from the UFC, Trator lost all of his three fights, with the most memorable loss coming at ACB 67 to Rasul Shovhalov by TKO.

Championships and accomplishments
Jungle Fight Championship
Jungle Fight Lightweight Championship (One time)
One successful title defense

Mixed martial arts record

|-
|Win
|align=center| (1)
|Fábio Silva
|Submission (rear-naked choke)
|Dispute Fight Series 1
|
|align=center|1
|align=center|2:01
|Santarém, Brazil
|
|-
|Win
|align=center| (1)
|Bruno Lobato
|Decision (majority)
|Macaco Fight 8
|
|align=center|3
|align=center|5:00
|Laranjal do Jari, Brazil
|
|-
| Loss
| align=center|  (1)
| Bruno Leandro Soares Lobato
| Decision (split)
|Macaco Fight 6
|
|align=center|3
|align=center|5:00
|Laranjal do Jari, Brazil
|
|-
| Loss
| align=center| 20–8–1 (1)
| Rasul Shovhalov
| TKO (punches)
| ACB 67
| 
| align=center| 1
| align=center| 2:17
| Grozny, Russia
| 
|-
| Loss
| align=center| 20–7–1 (1)
| Oberdan Vieira Tenorio
| KO (flying knee and punches)
|Eco Fight Championship 18
|
|align=center|1 
|align=center|3:36
|Macapá, Brazil
|
|-
| Loss
| align=center| 20–6–1 (1)
| Shane Burgos
|Decision (unanimous)
|UFC Fight Night: Lewis vs. Abdurakhimov
|
|align=center|3
|align=center|5:00
|Albany, New York, United States
|
|-
| Win
| align=center| 20–5–1 (1)
| Clay Collard
| Decision (split)
|UFC 191
|
|align=center|3
|align=center|5:00
|Las Vegas, Nevada, United States
|
|-
| Loss
| align=center|19–5–1 (1)
| Mike de la Torre
| TKO (punches)
| UFC Fight Night: Bigfoot vs. Mir
| 
| align=center|1
| align=center|2:59
| Porto Alegre, Brazil
|
|-
| Win
| align=center|19–4–1 (1)
| Akbarh Arreola
| Decision (unanimous)
| UFC on Fox: Lawler vs. Brown
| 
| align=center| 3
| align=center| 5:00
| San Jose, California, United States
|
|-
| Win
| align=center|18–4–1 (1)
| Ary Santos
| TKO (doctor stoppage)
| Jungle Fight 65
| 
| align=center|3
| align=center|2:48
| Madre de Deus, Brazil
|
|-
| Win
| align=center|17–4–1 (1)
| Geraldo Coelho de Lima Neto
| Submission (arm-triangle choke)
| Jungle Fight 59
| 
| align=center|3
| align=center|4:11
| Rio de Janeiro, Brazil
|
|-
| Win
| align=center| 16–4–1 (1)
| Leandro Vasconcelos
| Submission (rear-naked choke)
| Jungle Fight 56
| 
| align=center|1
| align=center|4:01
| Foz do Iguaçu, Brazil
| 
|-
| Win
| align=center|15–4–1 (1)
| Dimitry Zebroski
| Decision (split)
| Jungle Fight 50
|
|align=center|3
|align=center|5:00
|Novo Hamburgo, Brazi
| 
|-
| Win
| align=center| 14–4–1 (1)
| Rafael Alves
| TKO (retirement)
| Jungle Fight 45
| 
| align=center| 2
| align=center| 0:00
| Belém, Brazil
| 
|-
| Win
| align=center| 13–4–1 (1)
| Sebastian Latorre
| Submission (arm-triangle choke)
| Jungle Fight 40
| 
| align=center| 2
| align=center| 2:10
| Macapá, Brazil
| 
|-
| Win
| align=center| 12–4–1 (1)
| Silvio Jose da Silva
| Submission (anaconda choke)
| Jungle Fight 39
| 
| align=center| 3
| align=center| 2:37
| Rio de Janeiro, Brazil
| 
|-
| Win
| align=center| 11–4–1 (1)
| Rafael Addario Bastos
| TKO (punches)
| Iron Man Vale Tudo 23
| 
| align=center| 3
| align=center| 2:25
| Macapá, Brazil
|
|-
| Win
| align=center| 10–4–1 (1)
| Jamil Silveira da Conceicao
| Decision (unanimous)
| Tropa de Elite 2
| 
| align=center| 3
| align=center| 5:00
| Macapá, Brazil
|
|-
| Loss
| align=center| 9–4–1 (1)
| Silmar Nunes
| Decision (split)
| Amazon Fight 10
| 
|align=center|3
|align=center|5:00
| Belém, Brazil
| 
|-
| Win
| align=center| 9–3–1 (1)
| Neliton Jose Serrao Furtado
| Submission (anaconda choke)
|Golden Fight 2 
|
|align=center|3
|align=center|0:00
|Macapá, Brazil
|
|-
| Win
| align=center| 8–3–1 (1)
| Alexandre Alcantara
|Submission (rear-naked choke)
|Desafio de Gigantes 11
|
|align=center|1
|align=center|4:25
|Macapá, Brazil
|
|-
| Loss
| align=center| 7–3–1 (1)
| Rondinelli Rodrigues Gomes
| Submission (kneebar)
| Tropa de Elite 1
| 
| align=center| 3
| align=center| 1:28
| Macapá, Brazil
|
|-
| Win
| align=center|7–2–1 (1)
| Michel Addario Bastos
| Decision (split)
| W-Combat 14
| 
| align=center|3
| align=center|5:00
| Macapá, Brazil
|
|-
| Win
| align=center|6–2–1 (1)
|Nilton Eduardo Silva dos Santos
| TKO (doctor stoppage)
| W-Combat 14
| 
| align=center|1
| align=center|5:00
| Macapá, Brazil
|
|-
| Win
| align=center|5–2–1 (1)
| Danielson Gomes dos Santos
| TKO (punches)
| MMA: Evolution 4
| 
| align=center|2
| align=center|4:42
| Macapá, Brazil
|
|-
| NC
| align=center|4–2–1 (1)
| Danielson Gomes dos Santos
| NC (overturned)
| Ecofight 13
| 
| align=center|1
| align=center|0:00
| Macapá, Brazil
|
|-
| Win
| align=center| 4–2–1
| Oberdan Vieira Tenorio
| Decision (unanimous)
| Macapa Martial Arts
| 
|align=center|3
|align=center|5:00
| Macapá, Brazil
| 
|-
| Win
| align=center| 3–2–1
| Caio Felipe Bittencourt da Silva
| Decision (split)
| Iron Man Vale Tudo 21
|
|align=center|3
|align=center|5:00
|Macapá, Brazil
| 
|-
| Loss
| align=center| 2–2–1
| Fabricio de Assis Costa da Silva
| Submission (rear-naked choke)
| Ecofight 12
| 
| align=center| 3
| align=center| 2:45
| Macapá, Brazil
| 
|-
| Win
| align=center| 2–1–1
| Elielson Almeida
| TKO (punches)
| Ecofight 12
| 
| align=center| 1
| align=center| 2:43
| Macapá, Brazil
| 
|-
| Win
| align=center| 1–1–1
| Caio Felipe Bittencourt da Silva
| TKO (punches)
| Ultimate Finus Fighting 2
| 
| align=center| 2
| align=center| 3:34
| Macapá, Brazil
| 
|-
| Draw
| align=center| 0–1–1
| Alisson Deivid Rodrigues
| Draw (majority)
| Marques Fight 1
| 
|align=center|3
|align=center|5:00
| Laranjal do Jari, Brazil
|
|-
| Loss
| align=center| 0–1
| Alex Marcos Correia Ferreira
| Submission (armbar)
| Amazonia Combat
| 
| align=center| 2
| align=center| 1:40
| Macapá, Brazil
|

See also 
 List of male mixed martial artists

References

External links 
  
  

Living people
1987 births
Brazilian male mixed martial artists
Featherweight  mixed martial artists
Ultimate Fighting Championship male fighters